The Makury tribe (sometimes spelt Makuri, Makware) is one of the Naga tribes that mostly resides in Naga Self-Administered Zone in Myanmar and some in Nagaland, India.  They are one of the major Naga tribes of Myanmar and mostly inhabits around Lay Shi Township in Myanmar. However, in India due to lack of official recognition from Government of Nagaland are considered sub-tribe of Yimkhiung Nagas.

References

Naga people
Ethnic groups in Northeast India
Ethnic groups in Myanmar